York is a hamlet and census-designated place (CDP) in the town of York, Livingston County, New York, United States. Its population was 544 as of the 2010 census. New York State Route 36 passes through the community.

Geography
The hamlet is in northwestern Livingston County, in the center of the town of York. NY 36 leads north  to Caledonia and south  to Leicester.

Browns Creek runs through the north side of the community, flowing east to the Genesee River.

Demographics

References

Hamlets in Livingston County, New York
Hamlets in New York (state)
Census-designated places in Livingston County, New York
Census-designated places in New York (state)